Samantha "Sammy" Cools (born March 3, 1986) is a Canadian BMX (bicycle motocross) racer. Born in Calgary, Alberta, she was introduced to the sport by her brothers Ken Cools, coach of the New Zealand BMX team, and Greg. She currently lives in Ganddal, Norway.

Winning her very first race at three years of age and her first international race at age 10, she is now a 13-time Canadian national champion and five-time world junior champion. She was coached by Hervé Krebs. At the 2008 UCI BMX World Championships she finished fifth in the elite women event.

Cools competed at the 2008 Summer Olympics in the women's BMX. She qualified for the final in the event, but crashed after colliding midair with Gabriela Diaz seconds into the race. Although she did cross the finish line, she was officially classified as "Did not finish" and was ranked seventh.

References

External links
 
 
 
 
 
 Profile at Canadian Cycling Association
 bmxcanada.ca article
 Samantha Cools detailed CV

1986 births
Living people
BMX riders
Canadian female cyclists
Olympic cyclists of Canada
Cyclists at the 2008 Summer Olympics
Sportspeople from Calgary